Zwierzyn or Zwierzyń refers to the following places:

 Zwierzyn, Lubusz Voivodeship, Poland
 Gmina Zwierzyn, Lubusz Voivodeship, Poland
 Zwierzyn, West Pomeranian Voivodeship, Poland
 Zwierzyń, Podkarpackie Voivodeship, Poland
 Schwerin, Germany, called Zwierzyn in Polabian and Polish